Thomas Beekman (July 4, 1790 – February 2, 1870) was an American politician and a U.S. Representative from New York.

Biography
Beekman was born in Kinderhook, New York to John J. Beekman and Annatje Pruyn. His elder brother was Dr. John Pruyn Beekman (1788–1861), a member of the New York State Senate from 1845 to 1847.

Beekman studied law and became an attorney and farmer in Smithfield and later Peterboro.

Career
Beekman served in local offices including as a town clerk, and was active in the militia as aide-de-camp to the commander of its 17th Division.  Beekman was also active in the Anti-Masonic movement of the 1820s and 1830s.

Elected as an Anti-Jacksonian to the Twenty-first Congress, Beekman was U. S. Representative for the twenty-second district of New York and served one term, from March 4, 1829, to March 3, 1831. In 1831 he was an unsuccessful Anti-Masonic candidate for the New York State Senate.

Beekman later moved back to Kinderhook, where he farmed, practiced law, was active in several businesses, including the Kinderhook National Bank, and served as Columbia County Excise Commissioner from 1857 to 1859. After his retirement in the 1860s he spent summers in Kinderhook and winters living with his daughter in New York City.

He was married to Lydia Van Schaack.

Death
Beekman died in Kinderhook on February 2, 1870 (age 79 years, 213 days). He is interred at Kinderhook Reformed Church Cemetery.

References

External links

Govtrack US Congress

1790 births
1870 deaths
People from Kinderhook, New York
American people of Dutch descent
National Republican Party members of the United States House of Representatives from New York (state)
Anti-Masonic Party politicians from New York (state)
People from Smithfield, New York
People from Peterboro, New York
New York (state) lawyers
19th-century American lawyers
Beekman family
Pruyn family